Barbus macedonicus is a species of cyprinid fish.

It is found only in rivers Vardar, Pineios, Haliacmon and Loudias in northern Greece and North Macedonia.

It is threatened by habitat loss, water extraction, pollution and overfishing. Greece has a general fishing law but it is not enforced.

References

macedonicus
Cyprinid fish of Europe
Fauna of Greece
Fish described in 1928
Taxa named by Stanko Karaman
Taxonomy articles created by Polbot